Stephen Robertson (born 21 October 1963) is a New Zealand cricketer. He played in 13 first-class and 21 List A matches for Central Districts from 1985 to 1991.

See also
 List of Central Districts representative cricketers

References

External links
 

1963 births
Living people
New Zealand cricketers
Central Districts cricketers
Cricketers from New Plymouth